John Charles Robertson may refer to:

 John Robertson (Irish minister) (1868–1931), Irish Methodist
 John Charles Robertson (army officer) (1894–1942), Australian Army officer
 John C. Robertson (1848–1913), English-American contractor and builder